The Clay-body, clay corpse, or  (Scottish Gaelic) might be said to be an indigenous Scottish variant of the more famous voodoo doll.

Supposedly, when a witch wanted to destroy anyone to whom she had an ill will, she often made a "corpse" of clay resembling the unfortunate one, and placed it in some out-of-the-way stream under a precipice or waterfall, in such a way that the water trickled slowly on it. As the clay-body wasted, so the live body of the person it resembled was also supposed to waste away. Were the clay-body found, it was carefully preserved, and so the spell of the witch was broken. Sometimes pins were stuck in the clay body to make the death of the doomed one more painful. Several such bodies have been found, even around the turn of the 20th century.

References
  ((Corp Criadhach) with minor additions and corrections)

Scottish folklore